Together is the fifth studio album by Canadian indie rock band the New Pornographers. It was released on May 4, 2010 and debuted at number 18 on the Billboard 200.

The album was recorded in seven studios in British Columbia and New York City and features guest appearances by Zach Condon of Beirut, Annie Clark (also known as St. Vincent), Will Sheff of Okkervil River, and the horn players from Sharon Jones & the Dap-Kings.

Together is dedicated to the memory of Lynn Calder, the mother of keyboardist Kathryn Calder, and the half-sister of Carl Newman. "Sweet Talk, Sweet Talk" was featured in an early 2011 ad campaign for the Amazon Kindle, while "Moves" was used in a commercial for the Hyundai 2012 Accent and a commercial for T-Mobile.

The album covers features a detail from "The Cliff" (2006) by Martin & Muñoz.

Videos from the album include "Your Hands (Together)", "Crash Years", "Sweet Talk, Sweet Talk", and "Moves".

Release
Matador Records released the song "Your Hands (Together)" in February 2010 as the first sample of the album.

On March 23, the band announced their extensive North American tour in support of the album.

On April 25, the album was released as a digital stream on NPR's website, accessible until the album's May 4 release.

As of 2013, sales in the United States have exceeded 85,000 copies, according to Nielsen SoundScan.

Reception

Together was met with largely positive reviews. The album was a longlisted nominee for the 2010 Polaris Music Prize, a music award given annually to the best full-length Canadian album based on artistic merit.

Track listing

13-15 were bonus tracks on downloads of the album, and included as a bonus 7" single entitled Togetherness: The New Pornographers Play Outrageous Cherry with pre-orders of the LP in the U.S. and Canada.

Personnel
Dan Bejar - Vocals, Electric Guitar, Acoustic Guitar, Piano, Organ, Vibraphone, Percussion
Kathryn Calder - Vocals, Keyboards, Piano
Neko Case - Vocals
John Collins - Bass, Acoustic Guitar, Keyboards, Kaossilator, Hagstrom 12 String
Kurt Dahle - Drums, Percussion, Vox
Todd Fancey - Guitar, Banjo
A.C. Newman - Vocals, Guitars, Keyboards, Bass, Banjo
Blaine Thurier - Keyboards

Additional musicians
Annie Clark - Guitar Solo on "My Shepherd"
Zach Condon - Trumpet on "A Bite Out of My Bed"
The Dap-Kings Horns
Cochemea Gastelum - Baritone Sax
Dave Guy - Trumpet
Ben Kalb - Cello
Will Sheff - Back Up Vocals on "Moves"
Neal Sugarman - Tenor Saxophone, Flute
Tara Szczygielski - Violin

References

2010 albums
Matador Records albums
The New Pornographers albums